The Irish Professional Photographers Association is a non-profit association for professional photographers. In spite of the name, membership is not limited to Ireland.

Purpose
The Irish Professional Photographers Association (IPPA) is the network for qualified professional photographers throughout Ireland, and beyond.

History
The IPPA was founded in 1949. As of 2019, it has over 350 members. It is a member of the Federation of European Professional Photographers and the World Council of Professional Photographers.

Award qualifications
Fellowship (F.I.P.P.A)
Associateship (A.I.P.P.A)
Licentiateship (L.I.P.P.A)

Management Council
IPPA Management Council

President: Brendan Lyon, LIPPA

Regional Chairpersons
North & West:Kelvin Gillmor, AIPPA
South:Claire O'Rorke LIPPA
East:Dermot Byrne, AIPPA

Council Members:
Corin Bishop, AIPPA
Michael McLaughlin, AIPPA
John Ryan, AIPPA
Peter Gordon, AIPPA
Neil Warner, FIPPA
Tom Doherty, FIPPA

Charity work
The organisation runs an annual event, National Portrait Day (formerly Happy Faces Day), in March/April each year.  Since it first launched in 2006, National Portrait Day has raised almost €500,000 for its chosen charities.  Each year, the IPPA have harnessed the goodwill and the photographic skills of its members for the benefit of Irish charities, and they have selected ISPCC as their charity of the year for 2014. You can have your picture taken at your local qualified IPPA photographer's studio or event location for a €25 donation.

References

External links
Irish Professional Photographers Association (IPPA)

Irish photography organisations
Professional associations based in Ireland
1949 establishments in Ireland
Organizations established in 1949